Eight ships of the Royal Navy have borne the name HMS Undine, after the Ondines of mythology:

  was an iron paddle packet purchased in 1847 and sold in 1854.
 HMS Undine was to have been a wood screw gunvessel.  She was laid down in 1861 but was cancelled in 1863.
  was a schooner, previously in civilian service as the Morna.  She was purchased in 1881 and was sold in 1888.
 HMS Undine was a coastguard vessel, previously named HMS Hawk.  She was renamed HMS Undine in 1904 and was sold in 1906.
 HMS Undine was a base ship, previously named . She had been launched in 1884 for civilian service, at first as Hiawatha and then as Mizeppa.  She was purchased by the Navy in 1888 as a screw yacht tender and renamed HMS Wildfire. She was converted to a base ship in 1889 and was renamed HMS Undine in 1907, before being sold in 1912.
  was an R-class destroyer launched in 1917 and sold in 1928.  She was then wrecked later that year and the wreck sold for breaking up.
  was a U-class submarine launched in 1937 and sunk in 1940.
  was a U-class destroyer launched in 1943. She was converted into a Type 15 frigate between 1952 and 1954 and was broken up in 1965. 

Royal Navy ship names